Chionodes soter is a moth in the family Gelechiidae. It is found in North America, where it has been recorded from Nova Scotia and south-western Wisconsin to South Carolina and Illinois.

The larvae feed on Quercus rubra.

References

Chionodes
Moths described in 1999
Moths of North America